The Institut Catholique de Toulouse (or ICT) is a Catholic university in Toulouse, France.

The Catholic Institute of Toulouse (ICT) is a private institution of higher education including the humanities and social sciences, law and theology, as well as polytechnics.

Located in the historic center of Toulouse, in buildings constructed between the fourteenth and eighteenth century, the Institute is shared between the various faculties and institutes. It has three auditoriums, a library, a chapel, numerous rooms, research laboratories, an archaeological and historical museums. Located on the site of the old house where Saint Dominic lived. The school shared its name with an ancient Catholic University of Toulouse, which St Dominic helped found in 1229 with Saint Thomas Aquinas, whose tomb lies the church of the Jacobins. An 1880 law forced private schools to stop using the name "University", the university has been known since as the Catholic Institute of Toulouse.

The Catholic Institute of Toulouse is one of five universities founded by the bishops of France.

The Catholic Institute of Toulouse is a member of the International Federation of Catholic Universities, which includes 200 Catholic universities across the world and is one of 5 French Catholic institutes, including with Angers, Lille, Lyon and Paris.

On December 18, 2008, French government officials and the Vatican signed a decree in Paris regarding the recognition of diplomas, which entered into force on April 16, 2009 entered into force. The university's qualifications, certificates and diplomas have been recognized around the world.

Studies

Sectors of courses and qualifications 

Faculty of Law  
1. Free Faculty of Law

Faculty of Philosophy Free 
1. Faculty of Philosophy (state diplomas)
2. Faculty of Philosophy Canon (canonical degrees)

Faculty of Theology 
1. Faculty of Theology (FTSR) 
2. Faculty of Canon Law 
3. Institute of Science and Theology of Religions (ISTR) 
4. Institute of Sacred Music (IMS) 
5. Institute for Religious and Pastoral Studies (IERP)
6. Home Priests Asian students (APEA) 
7. Year of Formation of Priests and Religious (AFPR)

Free Faculty of Humanities
1. UR Literature, Language, LAS, Psychology, Communication, History, Heritage and Tourism 
2. European Communication Institute (ICE) 
3. Institute of French Language and Culture (ILCF)

Free Faculty of Humanities 
1. UR Literature, Language, LAS, Psychology, Communication, History, Heritage and Tourism 
2. European Communication Institute (ICE) 
3. Institute of French Language and Culture (ILCF)

Education, Pedagogy 
1. Institute of recruitment and training of Catholic education (teacher training schools and secondary) IRFEC

Schools attached to the Catholic Institute of Toulouse 
1. Higher Institute for Communication, broadcasting and multimedia ISCAM 
2. Toulouse School of Journalism (WCY) 
3. Engineering School of Purpan (EIP, formerly ESAP: Graduate School of Agriculture of Purpan) 
4. Institute for Training and Research in Health and Social Animation (monitors educators, aides, therapists, childcare) IFRASS 5. Institute for Development and the works council IIDC 
6. Centre for Ethics and Management EMC 
7. University Institute of French language and culture IULCF 
8. College Occitan 
9. Art Institute of Toulouse IART

Other religious training 
1. Institut Catholique des Arts et Métiers de Toulouse (Toulouse ICAM) 
2. Examination Centre of the University of Cambridge (exam preparation at the university)

Controversy 
In October 2017 a big internal crisis emerged related to the gouvernance of the Catholic University of Toulouse when the rector decided to fire the dean of Philosophy Andrea Bellantone accused of harassment.  After the matter became public, the bishops decided to step in to calm the situation. Both the dean and the rector were kept in place. Following that scandal, the rector Luc-Thomas Somme decided to resign a year later resulting in the resignations of philosophy professors and students.

References

External links
 

Catholic University of Toulouse
Toulouse